Uliyannoor (also known as Uliyannore) is a small village situated near Aluva within the Ernakulam district of Kerala, India. The village lies on the banks of the Periyar river (also known as "Aluva puzha"), close to Varapuzha and North Paravur. The villages  Uliyannoor and Kunjinikkara lying between two distributaries of the Periyar river that rejoin in Kayantikkara.

Filmography 

Vineeth Sreenivasan's song "Premam Aluva Puzha Song" was filmed at the Periyar river (2015).

Landmarks 
Uliyannoor Juma Masjid
Kunjinikkara Juma Masjid
Manar Masjid
Government LP School
Uliyannoor Mahadeva Temple

References 

Villages in Ernakulam district